Suzan Kay DelBene (née Oliver;  ; born February 17, 1962) is an American politician and businesswoman who has been the United States representative from Washington's 1st congressional district since 2012.

In 2012 she won the general election in Washington's redrawn 1st district against Republican John Koster, while simultaneously winning the election for the remainder of the term in the 1st district under the pre-2012 boundaries, a seat left vacant by the resignation of Jay Inslee.

DelBene chairs the Democratic Congressional Campaign Committee and is a former chair of the New Democrat Coalition.

Early life and education
DelBene was born in Selma, Alabama, the fifth child of Barry and Beth Oliver. At a young age, her family moved to Newport Hills in Bellevue, Washington. Later they moved to Mercer Island. In an autobiographical video, DelBene described her family's trouble paying bills and the hardship they faced after her father, a longtime airline pilot, lost his job. After fourth grade, her family moved around the country in search of work.

After graduating from The Choate School, a prep school in Wallingford, Connecticut, DelBene went to Reed College, where she earned a bachelor's degree in biology. She then continued her education at the University of Washington, earning a master's degree in business administration.

Business career
From 1989 to 1998 DelBene worked at Microsoft, where she was director of marketing and business development for the Interactive Media Group, marketing and sales training for Microsoft's Internet properties, and other business development and product management roles with Windows 95 and early versions of Microsoft's Internet Explorer Web browser. In 1998 she left to help found drugstore.com and serve as a vice president. In 2000, she became CEO of Nimble Technology, leading it through its acquisition by Actuate in 2003. In 2004, she returned to Microsoft as corporate vice president of the Mobile Communications Business until 2007. From 2008 to 2009, she was a management consultant and strategic advisor to Global Partnerships, a nonprofit supporting microfinance and sustainable solutions in Latin America. DelBene was named as the director for the Washington State Department of Revenue on November 30, 2010, replacing outgoing director Cindi Holmstrom.

U.S  House of Representatives

Elections

2010

In 2010 DelBene ran for the U.S. House of Representatives as a Democrat against the incumbent in the 8th congressional district, Dave Reichert, a Republican. According to DelBene's campaign website, the economy was her top priority. She was endorsed by the Seattle Times and the Seattle Post-Intelligencer, as well as several Democratic politicians.

DelBene faced Reichert in the general election, after coming in 2nd in the primary voting. In Washington, the top two advance. She lost to Reichert in the general election on November 2. She was named Washington State Revenue Director by Governor Christine Gregoire on November 30.

2012

DelBene ran for Congress again in 2012. She won the Democratic nomination for the redrawn 1st district, previously represented by Jay Inslee, which became more competitive due to redistricting. Inslee had resigned in March to focus on his campaign for governor. DelBene ran in two elections that day against Republican John Koster—a special election for the last two months of Inslee's seventh term (held in the boundaries of the old 1st), and a regular election for a full two-year term. She defeated Koster in both, winning the special election with 60% of the vote and the regular election with 54%. Her victory margin in the regular election was wider than expected, considering that the district was about six points less Democratic than its predecessor. On November 13, she was sworn in as the district's representative for the remainder of the 112th Congress, giving her a leg up in seniority over all but a few other representatives first elected in November 2012 for the 113th Congress.

DelBene spent $2.8 million of her own money in a race in which she raised over $4 million, in a Congressional race that became the most expensive in Washington state history.

2014

DelBene defeated Republican nominee Pedro Celis with 55% of the vote.

Committee assignments
House Ways and Means Committee (Vice Chair)

Caucus memberships
New Democrat Coalition (Chair)
Caucus on Virtual, Augmented and Mixed Reality Technologies (Co-Chair)
Digital Trade Caucus (Co-Chair)
Internet of Things (IoT) Caucus (Co-Chair)
Congressional Kidney Caucus (Co-Chair)
MedTech Caucus (Co-Chair)
Congressional Dairy Farmers Caucus (Co-Chair)
Reality Caucus (Co-Chair)
Women's High Tech Coalition (Co-Chair) 
Congressional Pro-Choice Caucus
Congressional Arts Caucus
Congressional Asian Pacific American Caucus
Veterinary Medicine Caucus
LGBTQ Equality Caucus
Diabetes Caucus
U.S.-Japan Caucus

Policy positions

DelBene is one of the leaders of the Pro-Choice Caucus and supported access to reproductive health care by serving on the Select Committee to Investigate Planned Parenthood, which was established under former Speaker Paul Ryan in 2015.

Electoral history

Personal life
DelBene's husband, Kurt DelBene, has served as Assistant Secretary for Information and Technology and CIO at the Department of Veterans Affairs since November 2021. He was previously Chief Digital Officer and EVP of Corporate Strategy, Core Services Engineering and Operations at Microsoft Corporation, and led the effort to fix the Healthcare.gov website at President Barack Obama's request.

DelBene is a practicing Episcopalian.

See also
 Women in the United States House of Representatives

References

External links

 Congresswoman Suzan DelBene official U.S. House website
 Suzan DelBene for Congress
 

 

|-

|-

|-

1962 births
21st-century American politicians
21st-century American women politicians
American Episcopalians
Candidates in the 2010 United States elections
Democratic Party members of the United States House of Representatives from Washington (state)
Episcopalians from Washington (state)
Female members of the United States House of Representatives
Living people
Microsoft employees
People from Bellevue, Washington
People from Newcastle, Washington
Politicians from Selma, Alabama
Protestants from Washington (state)
Reed College alumni
University of Washington Foster School of Business alumni
Women in Washington (state) politics